Pekka Narko (born 20 September 1945) is a Finnish sailor. He competed at the 1976 Summer Olympics, the 1980 Summer Olympics, and the 1984 Summer Olympics.

References

External links
 

1945 births
Living people
Finnish male sailors (sport)
Olympic sailors of Finland
Sailors at the 1976 Summer Olympics – Tornado
Sailors at the 1980 Summer Olympics – Tornado
Sailors at the 1984 Summer Olympics – Tornado
People from Tuusula
Sportspeople from Uusimaa